Euromarché (Euromarket) was a French hypermarket chain. The first store opened in 1968 in Saint-Michel-sur-Orge. In June 1991, the group was rebought by its rival, Carrefour, for 5,2 billion francs.

In June 1991, there were 77 Euromarché hypermarkets, 47 DIY stores Bricorama, and 57 cafétérias Eris. Sandra Mackey, author of The Saudis: Inside the Desert Kingdom, said in 1987 that it was "the French equivalent of K-Mart".

History 

In April 1981, Euromarché opened its first store in Saudi Arabia in Riyadh, and is the last Euromarché that exists today.

Until 2009 there was also a Euromarché store in Fort-de-France in Martinique when it changed to a Carrefour hypermarket.

References
 Mackey, Sandra. The Saudis: Inside the Desert Kingdom. Updated Edition. Norton Paperback. W.W. Norton and Company, New York. 2002 (first edition: 1987).  pbk.

Notes

Carrefour
Hypermarkets of France
Retail companies established in 1968
Retail companies disestablished in 1994